The men's 500 metres races of the 2013–14 ISU Speed Skating World Cup 2, arranged in the Utah Olympic Oval, in Salt Lake City, United States, were held on November 15 and 17, 2013.

In race one, Gilmore Junio of Canada and Joji Kato of Japan shared the first place, while Michel Mulder of the Netherlands came third. Sung Ching-Yang of Chinese Taipei won the Division B race.

In race two, Keiichiro Nagashima of Japan won, while Ronald Mulder of the Netherlands came second, and Mo Tae-bum of South Korea came third. Aleksey Yesin of Russia won the Division B race.

Race 1
Race one took place on Friday, November 15, with Division B scheduled in the morning session, at 12:24, and Division A scheduled in the afternoon session, at 14:29.

Division A

Division B

Race 2
Race two took place on Sunday, November 17, with Division B scheduled in the morning session, at 11:47, and Division A scheduled in the afternoon session, at 13:32.

Division A

Division B

References

Men 0500
2